, also called , is an umbrella term that encompasses diverse musical traditions of the Amami, Okinawa, Miyako and Yaeyama Islands of southwestern Japan. The word "Ryūkyū" originally referred to Okinawa Island and has a strong association with  the highly centralized Ryukyu Kingdom based on Okinawa Island and its high culture practiced by the samurai class in its capital Shuri. By contrast, scholars who cover a much broader region lay emphasis on folk culture.

Research history 
Comprehensive studies on diverse musical traditions of the Southern Islands was done by Hokama Shuzen and his colleagues. Prior to that, the scopes of research were limited to each island group (Amami, Okinawa, Miyako, or Yaeyama), or even narrower areas. These studies were done under the heavy influence of folklorists Yanagita Kunio and Orikuchi Shinobu, who searched for the origin of Japanese culture in the Southern Islands.

The research on Okinawa's musical traditions was started by Tajima Risaburō at the end of the 19th century. He was followed by Katō Sango and Majikina Ankō among others. Under Tajima's influence, Iha Fuyū, who is known as the father of Okinawaology, conducted extensive research on a wide range of music genres of Okinawa, primarily by analyzing texts. Although he paid attention to Miyako and Yaeyama, his studies on these subfields remained in a preliminary stage, partly due to the limited availability of documented sources. In Miyako and Yaeyana, pioneering work in collecting and documenting folk songs was done by Inamura Kenpu and Kishaba Eijun, respectively.

Hokama Shuzen, a successor to Iha Fuyū, worked on integrating separate subjects by comparative methods while he himself conducted field studies that covered the whole island chain. He stressed the importance of Amami, which was usually ignored or marginalized in Okinawan narratives. His lifelong research resulted in the Nantō koyō (1971), the Nantō kayō taisei (1978–80) and the Nantō bungaku-ron (1995).

Classification 

Musical traditions of the Southern Islands are so diversified that their connections are scarcely recognizable to unaccustomed eyes, but Hokama managed to organize them by cross-island group categories. The table above shows Hokama's classification presented in a volume of the Nihon min'yō taikan (1993). The table below is another classification by Hokama, which includes incantations and dramas.

The first category, "magic", refers to incantations that are chanted or sung with the belief of kotodama. Kume Island of the Okinawa Islands has a large repository of rainmaking spells. For epic songs, Okinawa's kwēna narrates fishing, rice farming, rainmaking, sailing, shipbuilding, house-building, weaving, and other kinds of work in a local community. In addition to these themes, foundation myths, metalworking, war, trade, and funerals are covered by umui. Miyako's āgu is famous for heroic epics. Lyric songs include Amami's shima-uta, Okinawa's ryūka, and Miyako's tōgani, which all have short, fixed verse forms.

Historical development 

Cross-island group classifications allowed scholars to investigate the historical development of musical traditions. It became a consensus that magical incantations were the oldest form, from which epic songs evolved. Lyric songs were the most innovative form and emerged from epic songs.

Ono Jūrō presented an evolutionary tree of the songs from the Southern Islands. He also made detailed analysis on song forms. According to Ono, the oldest form was a chain of 5-syllable couplets, which can be found in the Amami and Okinawa Islands but is absent from Miyako and Yaeyama. From the 5-syllable couplets, a 5-3 couplet, or the so-called kwēna form, emerged. The kwēna form spread from Okinawa to Miyako and Yaeyama. In the Ryukyu Kingdom on Okinawa Island, omoro was derived from the kwēna form in the 14th century but rapidly fell into decline at the end of the 16th century. Omoro was replaced by ryūka in Okinawa, which became shima-uta in Amami. Ryūka has a unique 8-8-8-6 syllable pattern. Ono considered that it was formed under the influence of kinsei kouta of mainland Japan, which has the 7-7-7-5 form. Hokama disagreed with Ono and hypothesized an internal development in Okinawa. Miyako and Yaeyama did not embrace the innovative form but created lyric songs using the older 5-3 couplets.

Since Ryūkyū was conquered by Satsuma Domain in the early 17th century, the samurai class in Shuri embraced the high culture of mainland Japan. The name of ryūka itself was coined to distinguish their own uta from waka. With the obvious influence from waka, they transformed songs to be sung into poems to be read.

References 

Ryukyuan music